Yannik Oettl (born 19 November 1996) is a German footballer who plays as a goalkeeper for Indy Eleven in the USL Championship.

Career
Oettl made his professional debut for SpVgg Unterhaching on matchday 37, on 16 May 2015, in a 1–0 win against Preußen Münster. His only other appearance for the first team was a 1–0 loss against Rot-Weiß Erfurt. He also made an appearance for the reserve team.

Oettl signed with FC Augsburg on 26 June 2015.

In 2017 he moved to the US and studies at the University of Central Florida in Orlando.

In 2021, Oetell appeared for USL League Two side Ocean City Nor'easters, making four appearances.

On 22 July 2021, Oettl signed with USL League One club New England Revolution II.

On 12 May 2022, Oettl joined Hartford Athletic on loan for the remainder of the 2022 season.

Oettl was announced as a new signing for USL Championship side Indy Eleven on 6 December 2022, joining the team for the 2023 season.

Career statistics

References

External links
 
 
 

1996 births
Living people
German footballers
Association football goalkeepers
3. Liga players
Bundesliga players
Regionalliga players
SpVgg Unterhaching players
FC Augsburg players
UCF Knights men's soccer players
SpVgg Unterhaching II players
Ocean City Nor'easters players
New England Revolution II players
Hartford Athletic players
Indy Eleven players
Footballers from Munich
German expatriate footballers
Expatriate soccer players in the United States
German expatriate sportspeople in the United States
USL Championship players
USL League Two players
USL League One players